Peperomia yeracuiana is a species of plant in the family Piperaceae. It was probably discovered in 1950 or 1939, the exact date is unknown. 

References

yeracuiana
Flora of South America
Flora of Colombia
Flora of Ecuador
Plants described in 1950
Taxa named by William Trelease
Taxa named by Truman G. Yuncker